A diplomat is someone who represents a government in its relations with other governments. It may also refer to:

Diplomat, the Diplomat or the Diplomats may refer to:

Games 
 Diplomat (solitaire), a solitaire card game

Media  
 The Diplomat, a Tokyo-based, on-line foreign affairs magazine
 The Washington Diplomat, an independent monthly newspaper based in Washington, D.C.

Fiction, film and television
 The Diplomats (film), a 1929 lost film
 The Diplomat (novel), a 1949 novel by an Australian writer James Aldridge
 The Diplomat (mini-series), a 2009 Australian mini-series
 The Diplomat (2015 film), a 2015 documentary film about Richard Holbrooke
 The Diplomat (TV series), 2023 TV series set in Barcelona

Transportation 
 Diplomat (B&O), a Baltimore and Ohio Railroad passenger train
 DeSoto Diplomat, a large car from the 1960s
 Dodge Diplomat, a mid-size car from the 1970s and '80s
 Opel Diplomat, a saloon car from the 1960s and '70s

Sports 
 Central Texas Diplomats, a basketball team of the United Basketball League
 Washington Diplomats, the name of several defunct American soccer teams

Music 
 The Diplomats, an American hip-hop group more commonly known as Dipset
 Diplomat Records, a record label run by the hip-hop group
 "The Diplomat", a song by post-punk revivalist English band Editors
 The Diplomats, 1960s R&B vocal group on Arock, Wand then Dynamo Records
 The Diplomats, 1970s English rock band led by Denny Laine, also including future Move and Electric Light Orchestra drummer Bev Bevan

Other
 Operation Diplomat, an Allied naval training operation executed during World War II
 Diplomat pudding, a dessert
 Montblanc Diplomat, a fine fountain pen made by the German company Montblanc

See also 
 Diplomacy